Chesterfield Mall (formerly known as Westfield Shoppingtown Chesterfield) is a soon-to-be-defunct shopping mall in Chesterfield, Missouri, at the intersection of Interstate 64/U.S. Routes 40-61 and Clarkson Road (Route 340). The mall opened in 1976, built by Richard Jacobs. With the closing of Northwest Plaza in St. Ann in 2010, Chesterfield Mall became the largest shopping mall in the St. Louis metropolitan area. The mall presently includes about 30 shops, three restaurants, and an AMC Megaplex theater. Chesterfield Mall's three anchor stores are all vacant, the last having closed in November 2022. In 2020, plans were announced to demolish the property in 2023 for a mixed-use development.

History

The mall opened on September 1, 1976 as the sister mall to Jamestown Mall in Florissant, Missouri. The mall's original two anchor stores were Sears and Stix, Baer, and Fuller. Two years later in 1978, the four-screen Chesterfield Mall 4 Cinema opened in a building separate from the mall itself, near the Stix/Dillard's building. In 1981, a Famous-Barr store opened at the mall. Three years later in 1984, Dillard's replaced Stix, Baer, and Fuller, after buying out the company. In 1995, a new Famous-Barr store was built adjacent to the former space, which JCPenney would later take over. The mall received a renovation in 1996. In 2000, the four-screen cinema closed. Five years later in 2005, the JCPenney store closed and the space was demolished, which made way for many smaller shops and restaurants, including Borders (currently V-Stock), The Cheesecake Factory, an American Girl store (closed as of 2018), a food court (also closed in 2018), and a 14-screen AMC Megaplex, which took up a new third floor. 

The mall was bought by Hull Property Group in 2018, after a (reverse) progression of ownership by CBL & Associates Properties (from 2007), the Westfield Group (from 2002), and Richard E. Jacobs Group initially. The mall was placed in receivership in the third quarter of 2016, pending foreclosure, with management transferred to Madison Marquette while a new owner was sought. The foreclosure finalized in June 2017, making C-III Capital Partners the temporary owner. The mall's anchor stores, though attached to the mall, are owned separately.

Borders closed in 2011 and was replaced with Books-A-Million and one year later, V∙Stock. Anchor store Dillard's closed in September 2016 due to flooding following a water main break. The store was expected to reopen in 2017, but in early 2018 the company finally announced that the location would remain permanently closed. In March 2018, the St. Louis area's only American Girl store, which was inside the mall, closed. On May 31, 2018, it was announced Sears would be closing this location as a part of a plan to close 72 stores nationwide, which also included the location at nearby mall South County Center. The store closed on September 2, 2018, leaving Macy's as the last remaining anchor store.
In late 2018, the AMC Cinema was downgraded to an AMC Classic.

In 2020, the Staenberg group announced plans to spend nearly $1 billion on overhauling the mall to be a mixed-use development with condos, apartments, offices and retail. In 2021, vacant parts of the mall were being repurposed for indoor community sports and other "eclectic tenants".

In 2022, it was announced that Macy's would close on November 11, 2022. Liquidation sales started in early September, leaving the mall with no anchors left, basically turning it into a dead mall. It is unknown what will happen to V-Stock, The Cheesecake Factory, and the AMC Classic Chesterfield 14, i.e. whether they'll be relocated or permanently shut down as well. In 2023, this mall will be closed and demolished and will be turned into Downtown Chesterfield in 2024.

Anchors

Former anchors
1. Macy's (2006 to 2022)
2. Sears (1976 to 2018)
3. Dillard's (1984 to 2016; closed due to flood damages, was slated to reopen in 2017, but permanently closed in 2018)
4. JCPenney (1995 to 2005; occupied original Famous-Barr building, demolished to build a new wing of junior anchors)
5. Famous-Barr (1981 to 2006; replaced by Macy's)
6. Stix Baer and Fuller (1976 to 1984, replaced by Dillard's)

Junior anchors
1. V-Stock (since 2012) 
2. The Cheesecake Factory (since 2006) 3. AMC Classic Chesterfield 14 (since 2006)

Former junior anchors
1. California Pizza Kitchen (1997 to 2018) 
2. Chesterfield Mall 4 Cine (1978 to 2000) 
3. Houlihan's (1997 to 2014) 
4. American Girl (2012 to 2018) 
5. Loft (2006 to 2020) 
6. Borders (2006 to 2011, replaced by Books-A-Million) 
7. Books-A-Million (2011 to 2012, replaced by V-Stock)

References

External links
 Chesterfield Mall website
 Hull Property Group

Buildings and structures in St. Louis County, Missouri
Shopping malls established in 1976
Defunct shopping malls in the United States
Demolished shopping malls in the United States
Shopping malls in Missouri
Tourist attractions in St. Louis County, Missouri
Shopping malls disestablished in 2023